Herman Roy Beckelheimer (December 25, 1886 – January 21, 1971) was an American football and basketball coach. He played college football at the University of Charleston (then known as Morris Harvey College) in Charleston, West Virginia from 1910 to 1913 before playing for the Vanderbilt Commodores football team in 1914 and 1915. Beckelheimer served as the head football coach at Morris Harvey in 1917 and from 1921 to 1923. He was also the head football coach at Bethany College in Bethany, West Virginia in 1919 and at Florida Southern College in 1920.

References

External links
 

1886 births
1971 deaths
American football tackles
Basketball coaches from West Virginia
Bethany Bison football coaches
Charleston Golden Eagles football coaches
Charleston Golden Eagles football players
Charleston Golden Eagles men's basketball coaches
Florida Southern Moccasins football coaches
Vanderbilt Commodores football players
People from Fayette County, West Virginia
Players of American football from West Virginia